The following elections occurred in the year 1834.

Europe

Spain
 1834 Spanish general election

France
 1834 French legislative election

North America

United States
 1834 Illinois gubernatorial election
 1834 New York gubernatorial election
 1834 and 1835 United States House of Representatives elections
 1834 and 1835 United States Senate elections

See also
 :Category:1834 elections

1834
Elections